In statistics, the generalized  Marcum Q-function of order  is defined as 

 

If , the integral converges for any . The Marcum Q-function occurs as a complementary cumulative distribution function for noncentral chi, noncentral chi-squared, and Rice distributions. In engineering, this function appears in the study of radar systems, communication systems, queueing system, and signal processing.

Properties

Finite integral representation
The generalized Marcum Q-function can alternatively be defined as a finite integral as 

 

However, it is preferable to have an integral representation the Marcum Q-function such that (i) the limits of the integral are independent of the arguments of the function, (ii) and that the limits are finite, (iii) and that the integrand is a Gaussian function of these arguments.

where 

and the ratio  is a constant.

For any real , such finite trigonometric integral is given by

where  is as defined before, and the additional correction term is given by 

Monotonicity and log-concavity

Series representation
 The generalized Marcum Q function of order  can be represented using incomplete Gamma function as

 

where  is the lower incomplete Gamma function. This is usually called the canonical representation of the -th order generalized Marcum Q-function.

 The generalized Marcum Q function of order  can also be represented using generalized Laguerre polynomials as

where  is the generalized Laguerre polynomial of degree  and of order .

 The generalized Marcum Q-function of order  can also be represented as Neumann series expansions

 

 

where the summations are in increments of one. Note that when  assumes an integer value, we have .

 For non-negative half-integer values , we have a closed form expression for the generalized Marcum Q-function as 

where  is the complementary error function. Since Bessel functions with half-integer parameter have finite sum expansions as

where  is non-negative integer, we can exactly represent the generalized Marcum Q-function with half-integer parameter. More precisely, we have

for non-negative integers , where  is the Gaussian Q-function.

Recurrence relation and generating function
 Integrating by parts, we can show that generalized Marcum Q-function satisfies the following recurrence relation

 

 The above formula is easily generalized as 

for positive integer . The former recurrence can be used to formally define the generalized Marcum Q-function for negative .

 The related three-term recurrence relation is given by

where 

We can eliminate the occurrence of the Bessel function to give the third order recurrence relation

 Another recurrence relationship, relating it with its derivatives, is given by 

where

Symmetry relation
 Using the two Neumann series representations, we can obtain the following symmetry relation for positive integral 

In particular, for  we have

Special values
Some specific values of Marcum-Q function are
 
 
 
 
 
 
 For , by subtracting the two forms of Neumann series representations, we have 

which when combined with the recursive formula gives

for any non-negative integer .

 For , using the basic integral definition of generalized Marcum Q-function, we have  

 For , we have

 For  we have

Asymptotic forms
 Assuming  to be fixed and  large, let , then the generalized Marcum-Q function has the following asymptotic form 

where  is given by

The function  satisfies the recursion 

 In the first term of the above asymptotic approximation, we have 

Hence, assuming , the first term asymptotic approximation of the generalized Marcum-Q function is 

where  is the Gaussian Q-function. Here  as 

For the case when , we have

Here too  as

Differentiation

We can relate the two partial derivatives as

Inequalities
 The generalized Marcum-Q function satisfies a Turán-type inequality

Bounds

Based on monotonicity and log-concavity
Various upper and lower bounds of generalized Marcum-Q function can be obtained using monotonicity and log-concavity of the function  and the fact that we have closed form expression for  when  is half-integer valued. 

Let  and  denote the pair of half-integer rounding operators that map a real  to its nearest left and right half-odd integer, respectively, according to the relations

where  and  denote the integer floor and ceiling functions. 

 The monotonicity of the function  for all  and  gives us the following simple bound

However, the relative error of this bound does not tend to zero when .

A very good approximation of the generalized Marcum Q-function for integer valued  is obtained by taking the arithmetic mean of the upper and lower bound

The tightness of this bound improves as either  or  increases.

Cauchy-Schwarz bound
Using the trigonometric integral representation for integer valued , the following Cauchy-Schwarz bound can be obtained

where .

Exponential-type bounds
For analytical purpose, it is often useful to have bounds in simple exponential form, even though they may not be the tightest bounds achievable. Letting , one such bound for integer valued   is given as

When , the bound simplifies to give

Another such bound obtained via Cauchy-Schwarz inequality is given as

Chernoff-type bound
Chernoff-type bounds for the generalized Marcum Q-function, where  is an integer, is given by 

where the Chernoff parameter  has optimum value  of

Semi-linear approximation
The first-order Marcum-Q function can be semi-linearly approximated by 

where

and

Equivalent forms for efficient computation
It is convenient to re-express the Marcum Q-function as 

 

The  can be interpreted as the detection probability of  incoherently integrated received signal samples of constant received signal-to-noise ratio, with a normalized detection threshold . Many expressions exist that can represent . However, the five most reliable, accurate, and efficient ones for numerical computation are given below. They are form one:

 

form two: 

 

form three:

 

form four:

 

and form five:

 

Among these five form, the second form is the most robust.

Applications
The generalized Marcum Q-function can be used to represent the cumulative distribution function (cdf) of many random variables:

 If  is a exponential distribution with rate parameter , then its cdf is given by 

 If  is a Erlang distribution with shape parameter  and rate parameter , then its cdf is given by 

 If  is a chi-squared distribution with  degrees of freedom, then its cdf is given by 

 If  is a gamma distribution with shape parameter  and rate parameter , then its cdf is given by 

 If  is a Weibull distribution with shape parameters  and scale parameter , then its cdf is given by 

 If  is a generalized gamma distribution with parameters , then its cdf is given by 
 
 If  is a non-central chi-squared distribution with non-centrality parameter  and  degrees of freedom, then its cdf is given by 

 If  is a Rayleigh distribution with parameter , then its cdf is given by 

 If  is a Maxwell–Boltzmann distribution with parameter , then its cdf is given by 

 If  is a chi distribution with  degrees of freedom, then its cdf is given by 

 If  is a non-central chi distribution with non-centrality parameter  and  degrees of freedom, then its cdf is given by

Footnotes

References 
 Marcum, J. I. (1950) "Table of Q Functions". U.S. Air Force RAND Research Memorandum M-339. Santa Monica, CA: Rand Corporation, Jan.  1, 1950. 
 Nuttall, Albert H. (1975): Some Integrals Involving the QM Function, IEEE Transactions on Information Theory, 21(1), 95–96, 
 Shnidman, David A. (1989): The Calculation of the Probability of Detection and the Generalized Marcum Q-Function, IEEE Transactions on Information Theory, 35(2), 389-400.
 Weisstein, Eric W. Marcum Q-Function. From MathWorld—A Wolfram Web Resource. 

Functions related to probability distributions